The Raad ("thunder") or RAAD is an Iranian wire-guided anti-tank guided missile based on the Soviet 9M14M Malyutka (AT-3b Sagger) missile. The Raad began mass production in 1988 and was publicly unveiled in 1997. It is manufactured by Parchin Missile Industries, a subsidiary of Iran's Defense Industries Organization.

The Raad family comes in four variants: the base RAAD missile, a clone of the 9M14M Malyutka-M (AT-3b Sagger); the I-RAAD, with SACLOS guidance, the RAAD-T, with a tandem warhead, and the I-RAAD-T, with both a tandem warhead and SACLOS guidance. The I-RAAD-T version is the most modern in the family and the most widely exported.

RAAD means thunder in Persian. It is not an acronym and many sources do not capitalize the name. It is not to be confused with several other Iranian weapons also named Raad, such as the Raad-1, the Raad-2,  Iran's Ra'ad anti ship missile or Pakistan's Ra'ad cruise missile.

History
During the Iran-Iraq War, Iran had an acute need for anti-tank missiles, necessitating the country to buy AT-3 Sagger missiles. Indigenous manufacturing work began in the tail end of the war and mass production began in 1998, with the Raad being the first anti-tank guided weapon to be built by Iran.  The weapon was unveiled on April 30, 1997. The RAAD has almost identical components with 9M14 Malyutka, from the battery to the guidance unit. The Raad is built under license.

According to SIPRI,  1500 RAAD/Sagger missiles were built or imported by Iran between 1996 and 2001 and 2,250 from 1996 to 2004.

As of 2015, 4,500 RAADs were made in Iran.

Combat use
Iran supplied Hezbollah with the Raad in the early 2000s and Hezbollah used Raad missiles in the 2006 Lebanon War.

Israel captured ten baseline RAAD missiles on the Karine A in January 2002.

The Raad has been used in the Syrian Civil War by Hezbollah and army forces. It is unclear if RAAD missiles were supplied to the army before or during the war. Some missiles have been captured by rebel forces as well.

I-RAAD-T missiles have been used in the Iraqi Civil War.

Variants

RAAD
The RAAD is an identical copy of the Russian 9M14M Malyutka-M (NATO AT-3b "Sagger").

RAAD-T
The first improvement of the RAAD missile, the RAAD-T has a tandem warhead to defeat explosive Reactive Armor. However, the RAAD-T still uses the obsolete MCLOS guidance of the original RAAD. According to its export material, the RAAD-T has improved maneuverability over the base RAAD and has 400 mm RHA penetration after reactive armor.

I-RAAD
For Improved RAAD, the I-RAAD has a different launcher with a tripod-mounted SACLOS guidance system that makes the missile much easier to aim. The specific SACLOS method is a TV differential tracker. The guidance unit is  similar to that of the Chinese HJ-73 system, and possibly the HJ-73C model in particular. First seen in 1998. In addition, up to four missiles can be linked to one I-RAAD launcher unit; it is considered a significant improvement. RAAD missiles can be used by I-RAAD launchers.

It's used to defeat ERA armor.https://odin.tradoc.army.mil/WEG/Asset/9K11_Malyutka_%28AT-3_Sagger%29_Russian_Anti-Tank_Guided_Missile_%28ATGM%29

I-RAAD-T
The I-RAAD-T system combines the tandem-warhead of the RAAD-T missile with the SACLOS guidance system of the I-RAAD launcher. RAAD and I-RAAD missiles can be retrofitted to the I-RAAD-T standard. The I-RAAD-T also includes a simulator that allows operators to be trained on the system without actually firing a missile. 400 mm RHA penetration after reactive armor.

Operators

Non-State Actors
 Al-Quds Brigades
  Hezbollah
 Islamic State: Acquired I-RAADs.

References

Anti-tank guided missiles of Iran
Hezbollah rocket systems
Military equipment introduced in the 1980s